A vulnerability scanner is a computer program designed to assess computers, networks or applications for known weaknesses.  These scanners are used to discover the weaknesses of a given system. They are utilized in the identification and detection of vulnerabilities arising from mis-configurations or flawed programming within a network-based asset such as a firewall, router, web server, application server, etc. Modern vulnerability scanners allow for both authenticated and unauthenticated scans.  Modern scanners are typically available as SaaS (Software as a Service); provided over the internet and delivered as a web application. The modern vulnerability scanner often has the ability to customize vulnerability reports as well as the installed software, open ports, certificates and other host information that can be queried as part of its workflow. 
 Authenticated scans allow for the scanner to directly access network based assets using remote administrative protocols such as secure shell (SSH) or remote desktop protocol (RDP) and authenticate using provided system credentials. This allows the vulnerability scanner to access low-level data, such as specific services and configuration details of the host operating system. It's then able to provide detailed and accurate information about the operating system and installed software, including configuration issues and missing security patches.
 Unauthenticated scans is a method that can result in a high number of false positives and is unable to provide detailed information about the assets operating system and installed software. This method is typically used by threat actors or security analyst trying determine the security posture of externally accessible assets.

The CIS Critical Security Controls for Effective Cyber Defense designates continuous vulnerability scanning as a critical control for effective cyber defense.

See also

 Browser security
 Computer emergency response team
 Information security
 Internet security
 Mobile security
 Dynamic application security testing
 Penetration testing
 Pentesting software toolkits
 ◦ OpenVAS
 ◦ Nessus
 ◦ Metasploit Project
 ◦ Snort

References

External links 
Web Application [need link to legit site, old site was hoax]
 National Institute of Standards and Technology (NIST) Publication of their Security Content Automation Protocol (SCAP) outline.

Computer security software